Thọ Xương is a ward of Bắc Giang city in Bắc Giang Province, Vietnam.

References

Communes of Bắc Giang province
Populated places in Bắc Giang province